The San Jose Center for the Performing Arts is a performing arts venue located in Downtown San Jose, California. It opened in 1972 and is now home to San Jose Dance Theatre and Broadway San Jose.

History

The theater opened in 1972 the architect was William Wesley Peters of Taliesin Associated Architects. Contractor was the Barnhart Construction Company. Less than three months after the theater opened a portion of the movable auditorium ceiling collapsed resulting in two workmen being stranded on a steel beam above the 15 ton ceiling crushed 100 seats, however nobody was injured and the two workmen were able to make it to safety. The theater was closed for repairs for several months and reopened in 1973. For 34 years, the theater was the home of the American Musical Theatre of San Jose (a.k.a. San Jose Civic Light Opera) from 1975 until the demise of the theater company in 2008.

Architecture
The center's auditorium has  2,677 seats, split into 1,921 orchestra and 756 balcony seats. It also has two smaller rooms, the Private Ridder Lounge with capacity for 150 and the Private President's Club with capacity for 50.

Notable events
FanFan - Road To Happiness World Tour - January 28, 2018
Joker Xue - Skyscraper World Tour - November 9, 2018

See also
 List of tourist attractions in Silicon Valley

References

Theatres in San Jose, California
Music venues in the San Francisco Bay Area
Performing arts centers in California
Music venues in California
Downtown San Jose
Tourist attractions in Silicon Valley
Tourist attractions in Santa Clara County, California
Buildings and structures in San Jose, California
Theatres completed in 1972